Derb Moulay Cherif is a neighborhood in Hay Mohammadi, Casablanca.

Derb Moulay Cherif prison 
Victims of torture at the prison include Saida Menebhi, Abraham Serfaty, Fatna El Bouih, Salah El-Ouadie, Abdellatif Zeroual, and others.

In literature 
Salah El-Ouadie addressed his torturer in a famous open letter: . Fatna El Bouih published Talk of Darkness (2001). Jaouad Mdidech wrote his memoir Derb Moulay Cherif: The Dark Room (2002) about his experience.

See also 

 Tazmamart

References 

Prisons in Morocco
Torture in Morocco
Casablanca
Hassan II of Morocco
Secret places